Cavalleria rusticana (Italian: 'Rustic Chivalry') is a short story by the Sicilian Giovanni Verga, published in a collection entitled Novelle rusticane in 1883 and presented in dramatic form as a one-act tragedy at Turin in 1884. Pietro Mascagni made this prose play the basis of the verse-libretto of his one-act opera, Cavalleria rusticana (1890).

Characters 

 Turiddù Macca
 Lola
 Alfio
 Santuzza

Plot 
The scene is a Sicilian village and the time Easter Day at the hour of mass. Turiddù Macca, a young peasant, son of a widowed mother, was in love with the coquette, Lola. On his return from military service he found her married to Alfio, a carter. Out of pique he paid his addresses to Santuzza, who fell desperately in love with him and on receiving his promise of marriage admitted him to her chamber. Lola, annoyed that Turiddù should love anyone else, ensnares him again, and her husband's frequent absences enable them to meet at her house. Meanwhile Santuzza finds herself about to become a mother. During the time of mass on Easter morning she rebukes Turiddù for his infidelity and begs him to return to her; but he refuses roughly, and Santuzza then reveals to Alfio, who has just returned from a journey, the relations of his wife, Lola, and Turiddù. Alfio finds Turiddù drinking in the village square after church and challenges him to a duel—a challenge which is sealed by the peasants' custom of embracing and biting the ear. They go out quietly and word comes almost immediately that Turiddù is slain.

Appraisal 
Helen Rex Keller writes, "The story both in its narrative and its dramatic form presents in lively colors the fierce passions and primitive customs of the Sicilian peasantry."

References

Sources 

 "Cavalleria rusticana". Encyclopedia Britannica. 4 September 2020. Retrieved 22 October 2022.

Attribution:

 Keller, Helen Rex (1924). "Cavalleria Rusticana". In The Reader's Digest of Books. The Library of the World's Best Literature. New York: The Macmillan Company. p. 131.

Further reading 

 Verga, Giovanni (1893). Cavalleria Rusticana, and Other Tales of Sicilian Peasant Life. Translated by Alma Strettell. London: T. Fisher Unwin.
 Verga, Giovanni (2003). Life in the Country, short stories, including "Rustic Honour". Translated by J. G. Nichols. London: Hesperus Press.

1883 short stories
1884 plays